Moderate Republicans may refer to:

 Within the United States Republican Party:
 Moderate Republicans (Reconstruction era), active from 1854 to 1877
 Moderate Republicans (United States, 1930s–1970s) or Rockefeller Republicans
 Moderate Republicans (modern United States), the present-day faction
 In France:
 Moderate Republicans (France, 1848–1870)
 Moderate Republicans (France, 1871–1901) or Opportunist Republicans

See also 
 Political moderate
 Republican (disambiguation)
 Republican Party (disambiguation)